The Alsedo class was a Spanish class of destroyer. Three ships were built, based on a British design, entering service between 1924 and 1925. They all served through and survived the Spanish Civil War, two on the Republican side and one with the Nationalists. The class was retired in 1957–1961.

Design and construction
On 17 February 1915, the Spanish Cortes (Parliament) passed a navy law authorising a large programme of construction for the Spanish Navy, including three destroyers of British design, the Alsedo class, to be built in Spain at the Sociedad Española de Construcción Naval (SECN) dockyard at Cartagena.

The design chosen, a joint effort by Vickers and John Brown, was of similar layout to the Hawthorn Leslie variant of the M-class destroyer. The British Director of Naval Construction  objected to current British destroyer designs being sold to a foreign nation, but could not stop the sale.

Displacement was  standard and  full load. The ships were propelled by two geared steam turbines driving two shafts, and fed by four Yarrow water-tube boilerss, giving a distinctive four-funneled silhouette. The ships had a crew of 86.

The ship's main gun armament consisted of three Vickers  guns (license-built in Spain) in three single mounts, with one forward, one aft the third gun between the second and third funnels, while two 47 mm anti-aircraft guns protected against air attack. The anti-aircraft guns were later replaced by four 20 mm cannon. Four  torpedo tubes were mounted in twin banks, with the class being the first Spanish destroyers to carry torpedoes of this size. Two depth charge throwers were fitted in about 1945. A rangefinder was mounted on the ship's bridge.

The First World War caused shortages of materials and equipment sourced from Britain, so the ships were not laid down until 1920. By this time, destroyer design had advanced, making the Alsedo class obsolete.

History
The three destroyers were launched between 1922 and 1923, and commissioned between 1924 and 1925. In early 1926, Alsedo supported the transatlantic flight from Spain to Buenos Aires, Argentina, of a four-man Spanish Air Force crew led by pilot Major Ramón Franco—the brother of future Spanish caudillo Francisco Franco—and including copilot/navigator Captain Julio Ruiz de Alda Miqueleiz in the Dornier Do J Wal ("Whale") flying boat Plus Ultra ("Farther Still"). The seven stage journey covered   nonstop on 30 January 1926 from the Cape Verde Islands to Fernando de Noronha. To lighten the plane for the third and longest leg of their seven-stage flight, Alsedo transported one of the aviators along the route so that he could meet Plus Ultra when it arrived at Fernando de Noronha.

When the Spanish Civil War broke out in July 1936, Alsedo and Lazagas crews sided with the Republican faction. Velasco, however, alongside at Ferrol, declared for the Nationalists and was damaged by Republican shelling before Ferrol fell to the Nationalists on 21 July.

Velasco was the only operational destroyer that sided with the Nationalists, until Italy transferred four old destroyers in 1937. This resulted in Velasco seeing heavy service, helping to sink the Republican submarine  on 19 September 1936, and taking part in the Battle of Cape Palos. The two Republican destroyers were mainly occupied by escort duties, with Lazaga towing the British destroyer  to safety when Hunter struck a mine off Almeria in May 1937.

Following the end of the Spanish Civil War, all three destroyers served with the Spanish State. On 17 May 1943 Alsedo and Lazaga were damaged by a large fire at the naval base at El Ferrol. The three destroyers continued to serve with the Spanish Navy until well into the 1950s, with Alsedo and Velasco being stricken in 1957 and Lazaga in 1961.

Ships

References

Notes

Sources

External links

 Alsedo class destroyers (in Spanish)
 Destroyers in Spanish civil war, with pictures

 
Destroyer classes